William Finlay Currie (20 January 1878 – 9 May 1968) was a Scottish actor of stage, screen, and television. He received great acclaim for his roles as Abel Magwitch in the British film Great Expectations (1946) and as Balthazar in the American film Ben-Hur (1959).

In his career spanning 70 years, Currie appeared in seven films nominated for the Academy Award for Best Picture, of which Around the World in 80 Days (1956) and Ben-Hur (1959) were winners.

Career
Currie was born in Edinburgh, Scotland. He attended George Watson's College and worked as organist and choir director. In 1898 he got his first job in Benjamin Fuller's theatre group, and appeared with them for almost 10 years.

After emigrating to the United States in the late 1890s, Currie and his wife, Maude Courtney, did a song-and-dance act on the stage. He made his first film , The Old Man, in 1931. He appeared as a priest in the 1943 Ealing Second World War film Undercover (1943). His most famous film role was the convict, Abel Magwitch, in David Lean's Great Expectations (1946). He also earned praise for his portrayal of Queen Victoria's highland attendant John Brown in The Mudlark (1950).

In the following years he appeared in Hollywood film epics, including such roles as Saint Peter in Quo Vadis (1951), as Balthazar, one of the Three Magi, in the multi-Oscar-winning Ben-Hur (1959); the Pope in Francis of Assisi (1961); and an aged, wise senator in The Fall of the Roman Empire (1964). He appeared in People Will Talk with Cary Grant; and portrayed Robert Taylor's embittered father, Sir Cedric, in MGM's Technicolor version of Ivanhoe (1952). But Ivanhoe also gave Currie one of his most delightful roles, highlighting his comic capabilities, as well as a willingness to still do some action scenes, even in his 70s. In 1962, he starred in an episode of NBC's The DuPont Show of the Week, The Ordeal of Dr. Shannon, an adaptation of A.J. Cronin's novel, Shannon's Way.

He was the subject of This Is Your Life in February 1963, when he was surprised by Eamonn Andrews at the BBC Television Theatre in London.

In 1966, Currie played Mr. Lundie, the minister, in the television adaptation of the musical Brigadoon. His last performance was for the television series The Saint which starred Roger Moore. Currie played a dying mafioso boss in the two-part episode "Vendetta for the Saint", which was shown posthumously in 1969.

Late in life, he became a much respected antiques dealer, specialising in coins and precious metals. He was also a longtime collector of the works of Robert Burns.

Personal life and death
Currie was married to American actress Maude Courtney. They had two children, George and Marion.

Currie died on 9 May 1968 in Gerrards Cross, Buckinghamshire at age 90. His ashes were scattered in Breakspear Crematorium, Ruislip, Middlesex.

Complete filmography

 The Old Man (1931) as Rennett
 The Frightened Lady (1932) as Brooks
 Rome Express (1932) as Sam (publicist)
 The Good Companions (1933) as Monte Mortimer 
 Excess Baggage (1933) as Inspector Toucan
 It's a Boy (1933) (uncredited)
 Princess Charming (1934) as Baron Seegman
 Orders Is Orders (1934) as Dave
 Little Friend (1934) as Grove
 Gay Love (1934) as Highams
 My Old Dutch (1934) as Mo
 Mr. Cinders (1934) as Henry Kemp
 The Big Splash (1935) as Hartley Bassett
 In Town Tonight (1935) as The Manager
 Heat Wave (1935) as Captain (uncredited)
 The Improper Duchess (1936) as Milton Lee
 The Gay Adventure (1936) as Porter
 Wanted! (1937) as Uncle Mart
 Glamorous Night (1937) as Angus MacIntosh
 Catch as Catch Can (1937) as Al Parsons
 The Edge of the World (1937) as James Gray
 Command Performance (1937) as Al, Arthur's Manager
 Paradise for Two (1937) as Creditor (uncredited)
 The Claydon Treasure Mystery (1938) as Rubin
 Follow Your Star (1938) as Maxie
 Around the Town (1938) as Sam Wyngold
 The Royal Family of Broadway (1939, TV movie) as Oscar Wolfe
 Leviathan (1939, TV movie)
 Sun Up (1939, TV movie) as Pap Todd
 The Great Adventure (1939 TV Movie) as Texel
 One Night, One Day... (1939, TV Movie) as James
 Crook's Tour (1941) as Tourist on Desert Bus (uncredited)
 49th Parallel (1941) as The Factor
 The Day Will Dawn (1942) as Capt. Alstad
 Thunder Rock (1942) as Capt. Joshua Stuart
 The Bells Go Down (1943) as District Officer MacFarlane
 Warn That Man (1943) as Captain Andrew Fletcher
 Theatre Royal (1943) as Clement J. Earle
 Undercover (1943) as Father (uncredited)
 They Met in the Dark (1943) as Merchant Captain
 The Shipbuilders (1943) as McWain
 Don Chicago (1945) as Bugs Mulligan
 I Know Where I'm Going! (1945) as Ruairidh Mhór
 The Trojan Brothers (1946) as W. H. Maxwell
 School for Secrets (1946) as Sir Duncan Wills
 In the Zone (1946, TV Movie) as Scotty
 Spring Song (1946) as Cobb
 Great Expectations (1946) as Magwitch
 Musical Chairs (1947, TV Movie) as Samuel Plagett
 Woman to Woman as Theatre Manager
 You Can't Take It with You (1947, TV Movie) as Martin Vanderhof
 The Brothers (1947) as Hector Macrae
 The Great Adventure (1947, TV Movie) as Texel
 So Evil My Love (1948) as Dr Krylie
 My Brother Jonathan (1948) as Dr Hammond
 Mr. Perrin and Mr. Traill (1948) as Sir Joshua Varley
 Sleeping Car to Trieste (1948) as Alastair MacBain
 Bonnie Prince Charlie (1948) as the Marquis of Tullibardine
 The History of Mr. Polly (1949) as Uncle Jim
 Edward, My Son (1949) as Sir Lawrence Smythe (uncredited)
 Whisky Galore! (1949) as Narrator (uncredited)
 Treasure Island (1950) as Captain Billy Bones 
 Trio (1950) as Mr McLeod (in segment Sanatorium)
 My Daughter Joy (1950) as Sir Thomas McTavish
 The Black Rose (1950) as Alfgar
 The Mudlark (1950) as John Brown
 People Will Talk (1951) as Shunderson
 Quo Vadis (1951) as Saint Peter
 Walk East on Beacon (1952) as Professor Albert Kafer
 Kangaroo (1952) as Michael McGuire
 Ivanhoe (1952) as Cedric
 Stars and Stripes Forever (1952) as Colonel Randolph
 Treasure of the Golden Condor (1953) as MacDougal
 The Broken Jug (1953, TV Movie) as Inspector Walter
 The Lass Wi' the Muckle Mou (1953, TV Movie) as Sir Gideon Murray
 Rob Roy: The Highland Rogue (1953) as Hamish MacPherson
 The End of the Road (1954) as Old "Mick-Mack"
 Beau Brummell (1954) as McIver, Brummel's Publisher (uncredited)
 Third Party Risk (1954) as Mr. Darius
 Captain Lightfoot (1955) as Callahan
 Make Me an Offer (1955) as Abe Sparta
 Thunder Rock (1955, TV Movie) as Capt. Joshua Stuart
 Footsteps in the Fog (1955) as Inspector Peters
 King's Rhapsody (1955) as King Paul
 Around the World in 80 Days (1956) as Andrew Stuart, Reform Club member
 Zarak (1957) as the Mullah
 Seven Waves Away (1957) as Mr Wheaton
 The Little Hut (1957) as the Reverend Bertram Brittingham-Bell
 Saint Joan (1957) as Archbishop of Rheims
 Campbell's Kingdom (1957) as Old Man
 Dangerous Exile (1957) as Mr. Patient
 The Naked Earth (1958) as Father Verity
 Tempest (1958) as Count Grinov
 6.5 Special (1958) as Himself
 Corridors of Blood (1958) as Supt Matheson
 Solomon and Sheba (1959) as King David
 Ben-Hur (1959) as Balthasar / Narrator
 Hand in Hand (1960) as Mr Pritchard
 Kidnapped (1960) as Cluny MacPherson
 The Angel Wore Red (1960) as Bishop
 The Adventures of Huckleberry Finn (1960) as Capt. Sellers
 Clue of the Silver Key (1961) as Harvey Lane
 Edgar Wallace Mysteries – "Clue of the Silver Key" (1961; US TV: The Edgar Wallace Mystery Theatre) as Harvey Lane
 Five Golden Hours (1961) as Father Superior
 Francis of Assisi (1961) as the Pope
 Joseph and His Brethren (1961) as Jacob
 Go to Blazes (1962) as the Judge
 The Inspector (1962) as De Kool
 The Amorous Prawn (1962) as Lochaye
 Cleopatra (1963) as Titus (uncredited)
 Murder at the Gallop (1963) as Old Enderby
 The Cracksman (1963) as Feathers
 Billy Liar (1963) as Duxbury
 West 11 (1963) as Mister Cash
 The Three Lives of Thomasina (1964) as Grandpa Stirling
 The Fall of the Roman Empire (1964) as Senator
 Who Was Maddox? (1964) as Alec Campbell
 The Battle of the Villa Fiorita (1965) as Emcee
 Bunny Lake Is Missing (1965) as Dollmaker
 Brigadoon (1966, TV Movie) as Mr Lundie
 Alice in Wonderland (1966, TV Movie) as Dodo
 Vendetta for the Saint (1969) as Don Pasquale

Partial television credits
 Danger Man – Episode "That's Two of Us Sorry" (1965) as Jock
 The Prisoner – Episode "The Chimes of Big Ben" (1967) as General
 The Saint – Episode "Vendetta for the Saint" (1968) as Don Pasquale (final television appearance)
 Gideon's Way Episode "The Thin Red Line" (1966) as the General

References

External links

 
 

1878 births
1968 deaths
19th-century Scottish male actors
20th-century Scottish male actors
Collectors
Male actors from Edinburgh
People educated at George Watson's College
People from Buckinghamshire (before 1974)
Scottish male film actors
Scottish male stage actors
Scottish male television actors